Eucalyptus capillosa, commonly known as wheatbelt wandoo, or mallee wandoo, is a species of tree or mallee that is endemic to Western Australia. It has smooth, grey bark, lance-shaped to elliptic adult leaves, spindle-shaped flower buds in groups of nine to thirteen, white flowers and barrel-shaped to cylindrical fruit.

Description
It has smooth, sometimes powdery grey bark with pink or pale orange patches. The flowering period is from December to May and the flowers are white.

Eucalyptus capillosa is a closely related and very similar to E. wandoo but differs in having hairy seedlings with more leaves arranged in opposite pairs, and adult leaves that are green rather than blue-green or glaucous.

Taxonomy and naming
Eucalyptus capillosa was first formally described by the botanists Ian Brooker and Stephen Hopper in 1991 from a specimen near Merredin and the description was published in the journal Nuytsia. The specific epithet (capillosa) is a Latin word meaning "hairy", referring to the hairy seedlings.

Brooker and Hopper described two subspecies that have been accepted by the Australian Plant Census:
 Eucalyptus capillosa subsp. capillosa is a small to medium-sized tree;

The name polyclada is derived from the Ancient Greek words polys meaning "many" and klados meaning "branch", "twig" or "stem", referring to the mallee habit of this subspecies.

Distribution and habitat
Wheatbelt wandoo (subspecies capillosa) is found in the central and eastern wheatbelt where it grows in low, open heath, mainly east of Pithara, Kellerberrin, Western Australia and Corrigin.

Mallee wandoo (subspecies polyclada) grows on gravelly slopes in tall mallee in the central wheatbelt from Pithara to near Hyden and Lake Grace.

Eucalyptus capillosa often forms open woodlands with a diverse understorey. Other species found in the upper storey include E. salmonophloia and occasionally E. salubris, E. loxophleba subsp. loxophleba and E. transcontinentalis.

Conservation status
This eucalypt is classified as "not threatened" by the Western Australian Government Department of Parks and Wildlife.

See also
List of Eucalyptus species

References

Eucalypts of Western Australia
Trees of Australia
capillosa
Myrtales of Australia
Plants described in 1991
Taxa named by Ian Brooker
Taxa named by Stephen Hopper
Endemic flora of Southwest Australia